The 1972 Football Championship of Ukrainian SSR was the 42nd season of association football competition of the Ukrainian SSR, which was part of the Soviet Second League in Zone 1. The season started on 6 April 1972.

The 1972 Football Championship of Ukrainian SSR was won by FC Spartak Ivano-Frankivsk.

Teams

Location map

Relegated teams 
 none

Promoted teams 
 FC Shakhtar Makiivka – (debut)
 FC Mayak Kharkiv – (debut)

Relocated and renamed teams 
 SKA Odessa was moved away from the Ukrainian championship, relocated to Tiraspol, Moldavian SSR and changed its name to FC Zvezda Tiraspol.
 SKA Kiev was relocated to Chernihiv and changed its name to SC Chernihiv.
 SKA Lvov was relocated to Lutsk (in place of the relegated Torpedo Lutsk) and changed its name to SC Lutsk.

Final standings

Top goalscorers 
The following were the top goalscorers.

See also 
 Soviet Second League

Notes

References

External links 
 1972 Soviet Second League, Zone 1 (Ukrainian SSR football championship). Luhansk football portal
 1972 Soviet championships (all leagues) at helmsoccer.narod.ru

1972
3
Soviet
Soviet
football
Football Championship of the Ukrainian SSR